In archaeology, a celt  is a long, thin, prehistoric, stone or bronze tool similar to an adze, hoe, or axe.

A shoe-last celt was a polished stone tool used during the early European Neolithic for felling trees and woodworking.

Etymology
The term "celt" seems to have come about from a copyist's error in many medieval manuscript copies of Job 19:24 in the Latin Vulgate Bible, which became enshrined in the authoritative Sixto-Clementine printed edition of 1592. Where all earlier versions (the Codex Amiatinus, for example) have vel certe (the Latin for 'but surely'), the Sixto-Clementine has vel celte. The Hebrew has לעד (lā‘aḏ) at this point, which means 'forever'. The editors of the Oxford English Dictionary "[incline] to the belief that celtis was a phantom word," simply a misspelling of certe. However, some scholars over the years have treated celtis as a real Latin word.

From the context of Job 19:24 ("Oh, that my words were inscribed with an iron tool on lead, or engraved in rock forever!"), the Latin word celte was assumed to be some kind of ancient chisel.

See also

References

External links
 

Lithics
Archaeological artefact types